George Skinner may refer to:

 George Skinner (footballer) (1917–2002), English footballer and football manager
 George Herbert Skinner (1872–1931), British boot and shoe manufacturer, pioneer motorist, inventor, and Olympic sport shooting medalist
 George Irving Skinner (1858–1926), lawyer and superintendent of the New York State Banking Department
George J. Skinner (1869–1935), American lawyer and member of the New York State Assembly